Vražaliceis a village in the municipalities of Rogatica, Republika Srpska and Pale-Prača, Bosnia and Herzegovina.

Demographics 
According to the 2013 census, its population was 11, all Bosniaks living in the Pale-Prača part thus none in the Rogatica part.

References

Populated places in Rogatica
Populated places in Pale-Prača